Herbert Wilson (1929–2008) was a British physicist.

Herbert Wilson may also refer to:
Herbert Wilson (Sussex cricketer) (1881–1937), English cricketer
Herbert Wilson (Nottinghamshire cricketer) (1892–1972), English cricketer
Herbert Wilson (footballer) (1893–1956), Australian rules footballer
Herbert Charles Wilson (1859–1909), Canadian politician
Herbert Wrigley Wilson (1866–1940), British journalist and naval historian
Herbert Haydon Wilson (1875–1917), British polo player
Herbert Ward Wilson (1877–1955), Australian naturalist
Herbert A. Wilson (1870–1934), American politician in Massachusetts

See also
Bert Wilson (disambiguation)